Thelidomus aspera is a species of air-breathing land snail, a terrestrial pulmonate gastropod mollusk in the family Pleurodontidae.

Distribution 
This species occurs in Jamaica.

This species has not yet become established in the USA, but it is considered to represent a potentially serious threat as a pest, an invasive species which could negatively affect agriculture, natural ecosystems, human health or commerce. Therefore it has been suggested that this species be given top national quarantine significance in the USA.

Ecology

Parasites
Thelidomus aspera is a host for larvae of the parasites Angiostrongylus cantonensis and Aelurostrongylus abstrusus.

References

External links 
 photos
 photo
 Pilsbry H. A. (1894). Manual of Conchology. Second series: Pulmonata, Volume 9. Helicidae - Volume VII. page 96. Plate 23, figure 25 shows reproductive system.

Pleurodontidae
Gastropods described in 1821